Symplegma viride is a species of ascidian tunicates in the family Styelidae.

References 

 Symplegma viride at WoRMS

Stolidobranchia
Animals described in 1886
Taxa named by William Abbott Herdman